Serena Williams defeated Jelena Janković in the final, 6–4, 7–5 to win the women's singles tennis title at the 2008 US Open. It was her third US Open singles title and ninth major singles title overall. With the win, she regained the world No. 1 singles ranking for the first time since 2003. This was also her second US Open and third major overall won without losing a set during the tournament. Three of the top four seeds were in contention for the No. 1 ranking at the start of the tournament.

Justine Henin was the reigning champion, but retired from the sport in May 2008.

This was the final singles major appearance for 1998 champion and former world No. 1 Lindsay Davenport, who was defeated by Marion Bartoli in the third round.

Julie Coin, ranked as the world No. 188, defeated the world No. 1 Ana Ivanovic in the second round, making her the lowest-ranked player ever to defeat a world No. 1.

Seeds

Qualifying

Draw

Finals

Top half

Section 1

Section 2

Section 3

Section 4

Bottom half

Section 5

Section 6

Section 7

Section 8

Championship match statistics

External links
Draws
2008 US Open – Women's draws and results at the International Tennis Federation

Women's Singles
US Open (tennis) by year – Women's singles
2008 in women's tennis
2008 in American women's sports